Claire Oberman (born 1956) is a Dutch-born New Zealand actress, known for her role as Australian nurse Kate Norris in the television drama Tenko.

Her other TV appearances include Fortunes of War as Mortimer, Paradise Postponed as Lonnie, Gentlemen and Players, as Alex Farrell in Trainer, as Mrs. Jeffrey Fairbrother in Hi De Hi, as Sarah in To Be the Best, Bugs and Eleventh Hour (2006).

Oberman played the role Shirl in the film Goodbye Pork Pie in 1981. She also appeared in the films Patriot Games (1992), and Dil Jo Bhi Kahey... (2005), and starred in the German TV play  (1983). She also appeared in the TV show The Two Ronnies.

Biography 
Oberman was raised in New Zealand and studied at Toi Whakaari: New Zealand Drama School, where she graduated with a Diploma in Acting in 1975. She currently works as a writer and an actress, residing in London.

Filmography

References

External links
 

1953 births
Australian television actresses
British television actresses
Living people
New Zealand television actresses
Dutch emigrants to the United Kingdom

Toi Whakaari alumni